Trudy Hellier is an Australian actress, director and screenwriter with many television credits to her name.

Selected credits
She was a main star in the Australian television programs Round the Twist and Frontline. She appeared on Blue Heelers, The Games, Neighbours, The Secret Life of Us, Guinevere Jones, State Coroner, Law of the Land and Driven Crazy.

In 2011 she appeared as Deb in the touring production of  Furiously Fertile. In addition to her acting, Hellier has also written and directed in the Australian TV and film industries. She won the Australian Film Institute Award for Best Screenplay in a Short Film for Break and Enter in 1999.

External links

Australian film directors
Australian screenwriters
Australian women film directors
Australian television actresses
Australian television directors
Living people
Year of birth missing (living people)
Australian women television directors